Waiola Church is the site of a historic mission established in 1823 on the island of Maui in Hawaii. Originally called Wainee Church until 1953, the cemetery is the final resting place for early members of the royal family of the Kingdom of Hawaii.

History
The first mission to Maui was founded by Reverend William Richards (1793–1847) in 1823. 
For a few years, temporary structures made from wooden poles with a thatched roof were used. In 1828, island Governor Hoapili supported the building of a stone and wood structure.
The Christian church was built adjacent to a pond surrounding an island called Mokuula, which was sacred to traditional Hawaiian religion and residence of the king. The first stone building was dedicated on March 4, 1832 and called Wainee Church.

Rev. Ephraim Spaulding (1802–1840) joined with his wife Juliet Brooks (1810–1898) from 1832 to 1836.
Rev. Dwight Baldwin transferred here in 1836, and served as physician, even though trained in theology. The Baldwins rebuilt the house of the Spaldings, which was kept in the family until 1967 when it was made into a museum.

Wainee served as the church for the Hawaiian royal family during the time when Lahaina was the Kingdom's capital, from the 1820 through the mid-1840s. Several members of the royal family were reputedly buried in the cemetery. A notable aspect of the cemetery is that the missionaries and Native Hawaiians were buried side by side.

Another building called Hale Halewai (meeting house) was built a few blocks to the northwest around the same time. In 1855 the congregation built a larger building, calling it Aloha Hale, completed in 1858. It was built to celebrate how Baldwin had spared the population of Maui from the smallpox epidemic of 1853. In 1859 the royal government added benches and desks and used it as a school. In 1862 the Episcopal Diocese of Hawaii used it temporarily.

In 1894 a fire destroyed the church. A new one was built from donations by Henry Perrine Baldwin, son of the original Baldwin pastor. In the 1950s a wind storm knocked down the bell tower of Hale Aloha and damaged the Wainee Church.  A modern church structure was finished in 1953, when the name was changed to Waiola. The bell from the Hale Aloha tower was salvaged for the new church.

Today
The congregation is pastored by licensed minister Kahu Anela Rosa. Sunday services are at 9:00 a.m. Services are a mixture of Hawaiian and English language and song. If you want to know the full beauty of a hymn, hear it in Hawaiian. 
 The congregation is affiliated with the Hawaii Conference of the United Church of Christ.
It is located at 535 Wainee street, Lahaina, Hawaii.

Hale Aloha was remodeled in 1908, but fell into disrepair, and was missing its roof a floor in 1973 when a restoration was begun by the Lahaina Restoration Foundation. The structure was rebuilt by 1985, and stonework by 1992. A bell tower that was built in 1910 was also restored.
A new bell was installed in the Hale Aloha tower in 2009. Hale Aloha is located on 600 Luakini Street.

The church and Hale Aloha are two contributing properties of the Lahaina Historic District, designated a National Historic Landmark District on December 29, 1962.

Burials in the cemetery
The tombstones in the cemetery, with death dates:
Keōpūolani, September 16, 1823
Kaumualii, May 26, 1824 (1825 on monument)
Nāhiʻenaʻena, December 30, 1836
Liliha, August 25, 1839
Ulumaheihei, also known as Hoapili, January 3, 1840
Kalākua Kaheiheimālie, also known as Hoapili Wahine, January 16, 1842
Kekauʻōnohi, granddaughter of Kamehameha I, 2 June 1847
William Richards, November 7, 1847

Gallery

References

Churches on the National Register of Historic Places in Hawaii
United Church of Christ churches in Hawaii
Religious buildings and structures in Maui County, Hawaii
Churches completed in 1832
Churches completed in 1953
Historic district contributing properties in Hawaii
Lahaina, Hawaii
1823 establishments in Hawaii
National Register of Historic Places in Maui County, Hawaii
Burial sites of Hawaiian royal houses